Cobra Kai is an American martial arts comedy-drama television series and a sequel to the original The Karate Kid films by Robert Mark Kamen. The series was created by Josh Heald, Jon Hurwitz, and Hayden Schlossberg, and is distributed by Sony Pictures Television. The series was released on YouTube Red / YouTube Premium for the first two seasons, before moving to Netflix starting with the third. The series stars Ralph Macchio and William Zabka, who reprise their roles as Daniel LaRusso and Johnny Lawrence from the 1984 film The Karate Kid and its sequels, The Karate Kid Part II (1986) and The Karate Kid Part III (1989).

The first and  second seasons launched on YouTube Red/Premium in May 2018 and April 2019. Netflix acquired the series in June 2020 after YouTube decided to stop producing scripted original programming. The third, fourth and fifth seasons were released in January 2021, December 2021, and September 2022, respectively. In January 2023, the series was renewed for a sixth and final season.

Cobra Kai begins in the fall of 2017, and re-examines the "Miyagi-verse" narrative from Johnny's point of view, beginning with his decision to reopen the Cobra Kai karate dojo, and the rekindling of his old rivalry with Daniel. Cobra Kai also stars Courtney Henggeler, Xolo Maridueña, Tanner Buchanan, Mary Mouser, Jacob Bertrand, Gianni DeCenzo, Peyton List, Vanessa Rubio and Dallas Dupree Young, with Martin Kove and Thomas Ian Griffith also reprising their roles from the films.

The series attained high viewership on both YouTube and Netflix, and has received critical acclaim for its writing, performances, action sequences, humor, character development, and homage to the previous films. It has received numerous awards and nominations, with the third season being nominated for Outstanding Comedy Series at the 73rd Primetime Emmy Awards.

Summary
Over three decades after being defeated by Daniel LaRusso in the 1984 All-Valley Karate Tournament in The Karate Kid (1984), Johnny Lawrence, now in his 50s, suffers from alcoholism and depression. He works as a part-time handyman, and lives in an apartment in Reseda, Los Angeles, having fallen far from the wealthy lifestyle in Encino that he had been accustomed to growing up. He has an estranged son named Robby from a previous relationship, whom he has abandoned. In contrast, Daniel is now the owner of a highly successful car dealership chain, and is married to co-owner Amanda with whom he has two children: Samantha and Anthony. Daniel is finally living the wealthy lifestyle he envied as a kid when he and his mother Lucille lived in Reseda. However, after his friend and mentor Mr. Miyagi died, Daniel's struggle to meaningfully connect with his children has disrupted the balance in his life. 

The first season begins in the 2017-18 school year, and follows a down-and-out Johnny using karate to defend his new teenage neighbor Miguel Diaz from a group of bullies. Johnny agrees to teach Miguel karate and opens the Cobra Kai karate dojo as a chance to recapture his past. The revived Cobra Kai attracts a group of bullied social outcasts who find camaraderie and self-confidence under his tutelage. Johnny develops a bond with Miguel in a manner that resembles the relationship between Daniel and Mr. Miyagi. Cobra Kai's philosophy, however, remains mostly unchanged, though Johnny tries to infuse it with more honor than Kreese did. On the other hand, the reopening of Cobra Kai revives Johnny's rivalry with Daniel, who vows to bring down the dojo. Robby gets a job at Daniel's car dealership as revenge against his father. Daniel forms a mentorship with Robby and begins teaching him the style of karate he learned from Mr. Miyagi. Later, Robby develops a rivalry with Miguel reminiscent of the rivalry between Daniel and Johnny, and on May 19, Miguel defeats Robby at the 2018 All-Valley Karate Tournament.

The second season takes place during the summer of 2018. Following Cobra Kai's victory at the 2018 All-Valley Karate Tournament, John Kreese returns to Cobra Kai, leading to tension between himself as Johnny. Meanwhile, Daniel reopens the Miyagi-Do dojo with Robby and Sam as his students in response to Cobra Kai's success, sparking a massive rivalry between the two dojos. Johnny also briefly reunites with original Cobra Kai members, Tommy, Bobby, and Jimmy (from The Karate Kid). After a brutal school brawl on the first day of school at the end of season two, Kreese seizes control of the Cobra Kai dojo and kicks Johnny out. 

The third season takes place during the fall of 2018, as Johnny forms the new dojo Eagle Fang. He also agrees to partner with Daniel as a means of combating the new Cobra Kai under Kreese. The season also showcases the return of Ali (from The Karate Kid), as well as Chozen, Kumiko, and Yuna (from The Karate Kid Part II). 

The fourth season takes place between January to May 2019, and revolves around Daniel, Johnny and Kreese agreeing to settle the fate of their dojos at the next All-Valley Karate Tournament. Kreese, however, brings back former Cobra Kai co-founder Terry Silver (from The Karate Kid Part III), who proves to be more dangerous than Kreese himself. 

The fifth season continues in 2019. With the help of Chozen, Daniel and Johnny plot to bring down Cobra Kai, which is now run by Silver (following a cheated victory at the 2019 All-Valley Karate Tournament and Kreese being arrested after Silver frames him for attempted murder). Daniel's former rival Mike Barnes and Amanda's cousin Jessica Andrews (both from The Karate Kid Part III) return in this season.

Cast and characters

Main cast

Supporting cast

 Joe Seo as Kyler Park (recurring, seasons 1, 3–5)
 Annalisa Cochrane as Yasmine (recurring, seasons 1, 3; guest seasons 4–5)
 Bo Mitchell as Brucks (recurring, season 1; guest season 3)
 Bret Ernst as Louie LaRusso Jr. (recurring, seasons 1, 3; guest seasons 4–5)
 Hannah Kepple as Moon (recurring, seasons 1–4; guest, season 5)
 Dan Ahdoot as Anoush Norouzi (recurring, seasons 1–3; guest, seasons 4–5)
 Vas Sanchez as Nestor (recurring, season 2; guest, seasons 1, 4)
 Susan Gallagher as Homeless Lynn (recurring, season 1; guest, seasons 2–4)
 Griffin Santopietro as Anthony LaRusso (recurring, seasons 1, 4–5; guest, seasons 2–3)
 Nichole Brown as Aisha Robinson (recurring, seasons 1–2; guest, season 4)
 Rose Bianco as Rosa Diaz (recurring, seasons 1–2, 4; guest, seasons 3, 5)
 Terayle Hill as Trey (recurring, season 1; guest, seasons 2–3)
 Jeff Kaplan as Cruz (recurring, season 1; guest, seasons 2–3)
 Owen Morgan as Bert (recurring, seasons 1–5)
 Ed Asner as Sid Weinberg (guest, seasons 1, 3)
 Erin Bradley Dangar as Counselor Blatt (guest, seasons 1, 3–4)
 David Shatraw as Tom Cole (guest, seasons 1, 3)
 Diora Baird as Shannon Keene (guest, seasons 1–5)
 Ken Davitian as Armand Zarkarian (guest, seasons 1–3)
 Candace Moon as Laura Lawrence (guest, seasons 1, 4)
 Randee Heller as Lucille LaRusso (guest, seasons 1–2, 4)
 Paul Walter Hauser as Raymond "Stingray" Porter (recurring, seasons 2, 5; guest, season 4)
 Aedin Mincks as Mitch (recurring, seasons 2–5)
 Khalil Everage as Chris (recurring, seasons 2–5)
 Nathaniel Oh as Nathaniel (recurring, seasons 2–5)
 Selah Austria as Piper Elswith (recurring, season 4; guest, season 2)
 Kim Fields as Sandra Robinson (guest, season 2)
 Ron Thomas as Bobby Brown (guest, seasons 2–3)
 Rob Garrison as Tommy (guest, season 2)
 Tony O'Dell as Jimmy (guest, season 2)
 Okea Eme-Akwari as Shawn Payne (recurring, season 3; guest, season 4)
 Yuji Okumoto as Chozen Toguchi (recurring, season 5; guest, seasons 3–4)
 Dee Snider as Himself (guest, season 3)
 Tamlyn Tomita as Kumiko (guest, season 3)
 Traci Toguchi as Yuna (guest, season 3)
 Terry Serpico as Captain George Turner (guest, seasons 3, 5)
 Seth Kemp as Ponytail (guest, season 3)
 Elisabeth Shue as Ali Mills (guest, season 3)
 Brock Duncan as Zack Thompson (recurring, season 4)
 Milena Rivero as Lia Cabrera (recurring, season 4)
 Oona O'Brien as Devon Lee (recurring, seasons 4–5)
 Salome Azizi as Cheyenne Hamidi (guest, season 4)
 Julia Macchio as Vanessa LaRusso (guest, seasons 4–5)
 Carrie Underwood as Herself (guest, season 4)
 Alicia Hannah-Kim as Kim Da-Eun (recurring, season 5)
 Owen Harn as Gabriel (recurring, season 5)
 Luis Roberto Guzmán as Hector Salazar (guest, season 5)
 Sean Kanan as Mike Barnes (guest, season 5)
 Robyn Lively as Jessica Andrews (guest, season 5)
 Sunny Mabrey as Lizzie-Anne (guest, season 5)
 Tracey Bonner as Dr. Emily Folsom (guest, season 5)
 Carsten Norgaard as Gunther Braun (guest, season 5)
 Tyron Woodley as Sensei Odell/K.O. (guest, season 5)
 Stephen Thompson as Sensei Morozov (uncredited, season 5)

Archival footage
The following characters only appear via archival footage from the film series:
 Pat Morita as Mr. Miyagi
 Danny Kamekona as Sato Toguchi
 Nobu McCarthy as Yukie
 Chad McQueen as Dutch
 Israel Juarbe as Freddy Fernandez
 Jonathan Avildsen as Snake
 Christopher Paul Ford as Dennis

Episodes

Production
The thematic genesis for Cobra Kai began with a few works of pop culture. First, the 2007 music video for the song "Sweep the Leg" by No More Kings stars William Zabka (who also directed the video) as a caricature of himself as Johnny, and features references to The Karate Kid, including cameo appearances by Zabka's former Karate Kid co-stars. In a 2010 interview, Zabka jokingly discussed this video in the context of his vision that Johnny was the true hero of the film. Next in June 2010, Macchio appeared in Funny or Die's online short, "Wax On, F*ck Off", in which his loved ones stage an intervention to turn the former child star from a well-adjusted family man into an addict besieged with tabloid scandal in order to help his career (with frequent references to The Karate Kid. A recurring joke in the sketch is that Macchio is confused for an adolescent. The short was lauded by TV Guide'''s Bruce Fretts, who referred to the video as "sidesplitting" and "comic gold". Finally, in 2013, Macchio and Zabka made guest appearances as themselves in the television sitcom How I Met Your Mother ("The Bro Mitzvah"). In the episode, Macchio is invited to Barney Stinson's bachelor party, leading to Barney shouting that he hates Macchio and that Johnny was the real hero of The Karate Kid. Towards the end of the episode, a clown in the party wipes off his makeup and reveals himself as Zabka. This influenced the launch of Cobra Kai, which gives a balanced perspective for Johnny, Daniel, and other characters. Zabka continued to be a recurring character throughout the ninth season of the show.

DevelopmentCobra Kai was greenlit in August 2017, with ten half-hour episodes, written and executive produced by Josh Heald, Jon Hurwitz, and Hayden Schlossberg. Although the series received offers from Netflix, Amazon, Hulu, and AMC, it ultimately ended up on the subscription service YouTube Red. The trio was joined by executive producers James Lassiter and Caleeb Pinkett of Overbrook Entertainment in association with Sony Pictures Television. YouTube Premium released the first season on May 2, 2018, and the second season on April 24, 2019. The creators of the series explored moving to another platform ahead of the season two premiere, but the deal did not go through.

The third season was produced for YouTube and was initially set for a 2020 release, but in May 2020, the series left YouTube and moved to another streaming platform, ahead of its third-season premiere. As YouTube was not interested in renewing the series for a fourth season, the producers wanted to find a streaming venue that would leave that option open. The show moved to Netflix in June, taking the third season with them. Netflix released the first two seasons from YouTube on August 28, 2020, and the new third season on January 1, 2021. A fourth season was renewed, prior to season 3 being released, and was released on December 31, 2021. The fifth season premiered on September 9, 2022. In January 2023, the series was renewed for a sixth and final season.

Miyagi-verse
Characters from the original four films The Karate Kid (1984), The Karate Kid Part II (1986), The Karate Kid Part III (1989), The Next Karate Kid (1994) comprise the Miyagi-verse that shapes Cobra Kai. Thus, after the launch of season 1, Elisabeth Shue (Ali Mills) from The Karate Kid, Tamlyn Tomita (Kumiko) and Yuji Okumoto (Chozen Toguchi) from The Karate Kid II, and Robyn Lively (Jessica Andrews), Thomas Ian Griffith (Terry Silver), and Sean Kanan (Mike Barnes) from The Karate Kid III, all discussed their interest in the series.

Since 2019, there has been a discussion about the potential involvement of Hilary Swank (Julie Pierce, The Next Karate Kid) in Cobra Kai. When asked about her involvement, she said that it would be a chance to have a "showdown" with Ralph Macchio. In 2020, the writers added that they spoke about every character appearing in the Miyagi-verse, including Julie Pierce, but they were not sure whether she will return or not in the franchise. Later in 2022, when again asked about her potential involvement, Swank stated that she is "not in Cobra Kai, no one's asked me to be in Cobra Kai...no one's called me!...but it's so funny, isn't it, that's the one thing I get asked the most and no one's called me?" A few weeks later, Ralph Macchio responded to questions about her comments by stating that "most of this rests on Jon (Hurwitz), Josh (Heald), and Hayden (Schlossberg) who create the show, and the writing staff. And we're always very collaborative and we always talk through things. They are great listeners and that's why, like I said, they care, and I care. So, I think that's why everything's working. I think there's certainly room in the Miyagi-verse...You would imagine that Julie Pierce and Daniel LaRusso knew each other even though we don't have those scenes and I'm not a part of that specific film. These guys just amaze me all the time with what they're able to create, and the fact that they just don't create it for fan service. They really create stories that work and enhance characters. And then the fact that it's fan service as well is why I think it's working on all cylinders. So, there's my long answer to the short question that I really don't know, but I expect if there's an opportunity it will be taken up on." 

Jon Hurwitz has also clarified that The Karate Kid animated series is not part of the Miyagi-verse canon, but an Easter egg from it appears in the season 3, in response to the question about its status within the Karate Kid franchise. The Easter egg was the Miyagi-Do shrine, briefly seen at Chozen Toguchi's dojo in Okinawa halfway through the season. The artifacts were recovered by Daniel LaRusso and Mister Miyagi in the short-lived Karate Kid animated series, which ran for thirteen episodes in 1989. Furthermore, the writers have also said that they will not be using characters from the 2010 film The Karate Kid, as they are not a part of the "Miyagi-verse": "We've ruled that out completely. Jackie Chan is mentioned in season 1 of the show as an actor, so I think in our world, Jackie Chan is an actor and a performer. If the characters on our show have seen a movie called The Karate Kid, they've seen that one."

Casting
In season 1, Ralph Macchio and William Zabka reprised their respective Karate Kid roles of Daniel LaRusso and Johnny Lawrence. Additional Karate Kid actors included Randee Heller, who reprised her role as Lucille LaRusso (Daniel's mother), and Martin Kove, who revived his role as John Kreese. The cast list for season 1 included Xolo Maridueña, Mary Mouser, Tanner Buchanan, and Courtney Henggeler. Ed Asner was cast in a guest role as Johnny's verbally abusive step-father, Sid Weinberg. Vanessa Rubio joined the cast as Miguel's mother.

In season 2, Ralph Macchio, William Zabka, Xolo Mariduena, Tanner Buchanan, Mary Mouser, and Courtney Henggeler all returned, with Jacob Bertrand, Gianni DeCenzo, and Martin Kove being promoted to series regulars and newcomers Paul Walter Hauser and Peyton List joining the cast. Actors from The Karate Kid, Rob Garrison (Tommy), Ron Thomas (Bobby), Tony O'Dell (Jimmy), and Randee Heller (Lucille LaRusso) made guest appearances during this season.

In season 3, Ralph Macchio, William Zabka, Xolo Mariduena, Tanner Buchanan, Mary Mouser, and Courtney Henggeler all returned. Actors from The Karate Kid and The Karate Kid II, Elisabeth Shue (Ali Mills), Ron Thomas (Bobby), Tamlyn Tomita (Kumiko), Traci Toguchi (Yuna), and Yuji Okumoto (Chozen Toguchi) all made guest appearances during this season.

In season 4, Vanessa Rubio and Peyton List were promoted to series regulars, while Dallas Dupree Young and Oona O'Brien were cast in recurring roles. In addition, Thomas Ian Griffith reprised his role as Terry Silver from The Karate Kid III, and actors from The Karate Kid and The Karate Kid II, Yuji Okumoto (Chozen Toguchi) and Randee Heller (Lucille LaRusso), made guest appearances.

In season 5, Yuji Okumoto had a recurring role as Chozen Toguchi. In addition, Sean Kanan reprised his role as Mike Barnes and Robyn Lively reprised her role as Jessica Andrews from The Karate Kid III. Alicia Hannah-Kim also joined the cast as Kim Da-Eun. Dallas Dupree Young, who joined the show in season four as Kenny Payne, was upgraded to a series regular.

Filming
Principal photography for the first season began in October 2017 in Atlanta, Georgia. Filming took place at various locations throughout that month at places including Union City, Marietta, and the Briarcliff Campus of Emory University. In November, shooting moved to locales such as the North Atlanta Soccer Association Tophat fields in East Cobb. In December, the production was working out of Marietta and Conyers. Various exterior shots were also filmed in parts of Los Angeles such as Tarzana and Encino. Exterior locations included Golf N' Stuff in Norwalk and the South Seas Apartments in Reseda, both of which were originally featured in The Karate Kid.

Principal photography for the second season began in September 2018 in Atlanta, Georgia. In October, production continued around Atlanta with shooting also occurring in Marietta. In November, the series was filming in Union City. In December, shooting transpired at the closed Rio Bravo Cantina restaurant in Atlanta.

Principal photography for the fourth season began in February 2021 and ended in April in Atlanta, Georgia.

Filming for the fifth season began in September 2021 and finished in December.

Release
Marketing
The series was promoted at the annual Television Critics Association's winter press tour held in January 2018, when YouTube's global head of original content Susanne Daniels described the show: "It is a half an hour format but I would call it a dramedy. I think it leans into the tone of the movies in that there are dramatic moments throughout. I think it's very faithful really in some ways to what the movie set about doing, the lessons imparted in the movie if you will. It's next generation Karate Kid."

Several trailers for the show were released from February to March, before the premiere date was revealed to be May 2.

YouTube Premium released a six-minute commercial parodying ESPN's 30 for 30 in April 2019, featuring the main cast members and select ESPN personalities analyzing the 1984 match between Daniel and Johnny. It was nominated for a Clio Award.

Premiere
The series held its world premiere on April 24, 2018, at the SVA Theatre in New York City, New York, during the annual Tribeca Film Festival. Following the screening, a discussion was held with writers, directors, and executive producers Hayden Schlossberg, Jon Hurwitz, and Josh Heald, in addition to series stars and co-executive producers William Zabka and Ralph Macchio.

YouTube partnered with Fathom Events for special screenings of the first two episodes of the series at around 700 movie theaters across the United States. The event also included a screening of the original film.

Reception
Critical response

All five seasons of Cobra Kai have received positive critical reviews. At the review aggregator website Rotten Tomatoes, the entire series received a 95% approval rating. On Metacritic, which uses a weighted average, the series holds an average rating of 71 out of 100.

The first season had a positive response from critics. At Rotten Tomatoes, it holds a 100% approval rating, with an average score of 7.5 out of 10 based on 49 reviews. The website's critical consensus reads: "Cobra Kai continues the Karate Kid franchise with a blend of pleasantly corny nostalgia and teen angst, elevated by a cast of well-written characters." Cobra Kai was 2018's best-reviewed TV drama on Rotten Tomatoes. Metacritic assigned the season a score of 72 out of 100 based on 11 critics, indicating "generally favorable reviews".

The second season had a positive response from critics. At the review aggregator website Rotten Tomatoes, it holds an 90% approval rating with an average score of 7.4 out of 10, based on 31 reviews. Its critical consensus reads: "While Cobra Kai's subversive kick no longer carries the same gleeful impact of its inaugural season, its second round is still among the best around – no amount of mid-life crisis and teenage ennui's ever gonna keep it down." Metacritic's weighted average assigned the second season a score of 66 out of 100, based on seven critics, indicating "generally favorable reviews".

The third season of the series had a positive response from critics. At the review aggregator website Rotten Tomatoes, it holds an 90% approval rating, with an average score of 8 out of 10 based on 51 reviews. The website's critical consensus reads: "By pairing its emotional punches with stronger humor, Cobra Kai's third season finds itself in fine fighting form." On Metacritic with its weighted average, assigned a score of 72 out of 100, based on 15 critics, indicating "generally favorable reviews".

The fourth season had a positive response from critics. It received a 95% Rotten Tomatoes approval rating, with an average score of 7.9 out of 10 based on 37 reviews. The website's critical consensus reads: "Cobra Kai still delights in a fourth season that mines great fun from shifting alliances, chiefly the uneasy truce between Johnny Lawrence and Daniel LaRusso." Metacritic's weighted average assigned the fourth season a score of 70 out of 100, based on eight critics, indicating "generally favorable reviews".

The fifth season has received a positive response from critics. It has received a Rotten Tomatoes approval rating of 100%, with an average rating of 8 out of 10 based on 33 reviews. The site's critical consensus reads: "Deftly managing an expanded roster of punchy personalities, Cobra Kai graduates to a black belt proficiency in heartfelt melodrama and sly humor." On Metacritic, it has received a weighted score of 78 out of 100, based on seven critics, indicating "generally favorable reviews".

Viewership
YouTube
The first episode, which was posted on YouTube for free along with episode two, had been viewed 5.4 million times within the first 24 hours. While it was noted that the response had been, in part, a result of YouTube releasing the episode for free, it was noted by Cinema Blends Britt Lawrence that YouTube Red's new series debuted to numbers that made rival streaming services take notice. By October 30, 2018, ahead of the second-season premiere, YouTube was promoting the report that the first episode had then been viewed over 50 million times. The first episode was No. 8 on YouTube's list of ten top-trending videos of 2018.

According to market research company Parrot Analytics, the first season of Cobra Kai was the world's most in-demand streaming television show during May 2018. Parrot Analytics later reported that the second season of Cobra Kai was the world's most in-demand digital television show during April and through May 2019. , the season 1 premiere has over 90million views, and the season 2 premiere has over 86million views.

Netflix
After the series moved to Netflix in August 2020, season 1 and season 2 of Cobra Kai became the most-watched series on the platform. It was the most-watched show on streaming media in the United States between August 29 and September 6, according to Nielsen ratings. During the week, the show's 20 episodes drew nearly  streaming minutes in the United States. The first season was watched on Netflix by  member households in its first four weeks, making Cobra Kai the most-streamed show on Netflix during the month of September 2020.

In February 2021, after the release of season 3, Forbes announced that it "kicked off 2021 as one of most viewed original series on a streaming platform". During the period of December 28, 2020January 3, 2021, it came in "second only to Netflix's Bridgerton", with over 2.6 billion viewing minutes. Cobra Kai then moved to first place during the period of January 4–10, 2021. Critics also offered cultural commentary in response to season three. Jen Yamato of Los Angeles Times stated that by the end of season three, there are three white men at the center of Cobra Kai, a franchise rooted in and deeply indebted to Eastern tradition. Gustavo Arellano of Los Angeles Times suggested that Cobra Kai offers a "way forward for all of us during these tumultuous times", as he saw this uplifting season 3 finale the weekend before the Jan. 6 U.S. Capitol invasion. The Hollywood Reporter, former NBA champion and student of martial arts Kareem Abdul-Jabbar suggested that his friend and teacher, the late Bruce Lee, was linked to the influence of the original Karate Kid films. Finally, Albert Wu and Michelle Kuo of the Los Angeles Review of Books argued that while the original Karate Kid "film functioned as a post-Vietnam critique of American empire, staking its position explicitly: pacifism over violence, peace over war, an admittedly romanticized version of Eastern wisdom over the macho bravado of jock culture", Cobra Kai "models" the "unending appeal" of the "American Empire".

Awards and nominations

|-
| rowspan="4" align="center"| 2018
| rowspan="2" align="center"| Teen Choice Awards
| Choice Summer TV Show
| Cobra Kai| 
| rowspan="2" align="center"| 
|-
| Choice Summer TV Star
| Xolo Maridueña
| 
|-
| align="center"| Imagen Awards
| Best Young Actor – Television
| Xolo Maridueña
| 
| align="center"| 
|-
| align="center"| Primetime Creative Arts Emmy Awards
| Outstanding Stunt Coordination for a Comedy Series or Variety Program
| Hiro Koda
| 
| align="center"| 
|-
| rowspan="4" align="center"| 2019
| align="center"| Shorty Awards
| Best Web Series
| Cobra Kai| 
| align="center"|
|-
| align="center"| Primetime Creative Arts Emmy Awards
| Outstanding Stunt Coordination for a Comedy Series or Variety Program
| Hiro Koda
| 
| align="center"| 
|-
| align="center"| Teen Choice Awards
| Choice Summer TV Show
| Cobra Kai| 
| align="center"|
|-
| align="center"| Clio Awards
| Television/Streaming: Social Media-30 for 30
| Cobra Kai| 
| align="center"|
|-
| rowspan="13" align="center"| 2021
| align="center"| Nickelodeon Kids' Choice Awards
| Favorite Family TV Show
| Cobra Kai| 
| align="center"|
|-
| rowspan="3" align="center"| MTV Movie & TV Awards
| Best Show
| Cobra Kai| 
| rowspan="3" align="center"|
|-
| Best Fight
| "Finale House Fight" 
| 
|-
| Best Musical Moment
| "I Wanna Rock" 
| 
|-
| align="center"| Screen Actors Guild Awards
| Outstanding Performance by a Stunt Ensemble in a Comedy or Drama Series
| Cobra Kai| 
| align="center"|
|-
| align="center"| Hollywood Critics Association TV Awards
| Best Streaming Series, Comedy
| Cobra Kai| 
| align="center"|
|-
| align="center"| Primetime Emmy Awards
| Outstanding Comedy Series
| Hayden Schlossberg, Jon Hurwitz, Josh Heald, Caleeb Pinkett, Susan Ekins, James Lassiter, Will Smith, Ralph Macchio, William Zabka, Luan Thomas, Joe Piarulli, Michael Jonathan Smith, Stacey Harman, Bob Dearden and Bob Wilson
| 
| rowspan="4" align="center"|  
|-
| rowspan="3" align="center"| Primetime Creative Arts Emmy Awards
| Outstanding Sound Editing for a Comedy or Drama Series (Half-Hour) and Animation
| Patrick Hogan, Jesse Pomeroy, Daniel Salas, Ryne Gierke, AJ Shapiro, Andres Locsey, Shane Bruce and Mitchell Kohen 
| 
|-
| Outstanding Sound Mixing for a Comedy or Drama Series (Half-Hour) and Animation
| Joe DeAngelis, Chris Carpenter, Mike Filosa and Phil McGowan 
| 
|-
| Outstanding Stunt Performance
| Jahnel Curfman, Julia Maggio, John Cihangir and Marc Canonizado 
| 
|-
| rowspan="3" align="center"| People's Choice Awards
| The Show of 2021
| rowspan="3" | Cobra Kai| 
| rowspan="3" align="center"|
|-
| The Drama Show of 2021
| 
|-
| The Bingeworthy Show of 2021
| 
|-
| rowspan="7" align="center"| 2022
| align="center"| Screen Actors Guild Awards
| Outstanding Performance by a Stunt Ensemble in a Comedy or Drama Series
| Cobra Kai| 
| align="center"|
|-
| align="center"| Nickelodeon Kids' Choice Awards
| Favorite Family TV Show
| Cobra Kai| 
| align="center"|
|-
| align="center" | People's Choice Awards
| The Drama Show of 2022
| Cobra Kai| 
| align="center"| 
|-
| rowspan="2" align="center"| Primetime Creative Arts Emmy Awards
| Outstanding Sound Editing for a Comedy or Drama Series (Half-Hour) and Animation
| Patrick Hogan, Daniel Salas, Jesse Pomeroy, Gary DeLeone, Nick Papalia, Andres Locsey, and Mitchell Cohen (for "The Rise)
| 
| rowspan="2" align="center"|
|-
| Outstanding Stunt Coordination for a Comedy Series or Variety Program
| Ken Barefield
| 
|-
| align="center"| Saturn Awards
| Best Action/Adventure Television Series (Streaming)
| Cobra Kai| 
| align="center"|
|}

Home media
During the show's time on YouTube Red, Cobra Kai was not released on DVD, but once the show made its move to Netflix, Sony Pictures released the first and second seasons in a "Collector's Edition" DVD set on November 24, 2020 in the United States. In 2022, Sony Pictures released the third season in January and the fourth in September, both in the United States.

Key
 = Available only on DVD
 = Available only on Blu-ray
 = Available on both DVD & Blu-ray

Soundtracks

Cobra Kai: Wax Off – EP

Madison Gate Records released an extended play entitled Cobra Kai: Wax Off – EP on July 23, 2021, featuring extended versions of four previously released tracks from the first two seasons soundtracks.

Track listing

Video gamesCobra Kai: The Karate Kid Saga Continues, a video game based on the series, was released for PlayStation 4, Xbox One, and Nintendo Switch on October 27, 2020, and for Microsoft Windows on January 5, 2021.

A mobile game entitled Cobra Kai: Card Fighter was released on March 19, 2021, on iOS and Android devices.

Book
In 2022, Ralph Macchio published the memoir Waxing On: The Karate Kid and Me (Dutton), in which he reflects upon the making of and legacy of the Karate Kid films and Cobra Kai''.

References

Notes

External links

  (includes trailers for all seasons)
 
 The Karate Kid and Cobra Kai (video) – Reunited Apart, December 21, 2020
 Whoopi Goldberg Shares Thoughts on "Cobra Kai" Series – The View, September 9, 2020
 Ralph Macchio and William Zabka Discuss "Cobra Kai" and Reminisce About Mr. Miyagi – The View, January 12, 2021
 Ralph Macchio of "Cobra Kai" on Memoir "Waxing On: The Karate Kid and Me"– The View, October 18, 2022. 
 Ralph Macchio on His Friend and 'Karate Kid' Costar Pat Morita: His Legacy 'Shines Brighter Than Ever' - People, November 6, 2022

Cobra Kai
2010s American comedy-drama television series
2010s American high school television series
2010s American teen drama television series
2020s American comedy-drama television series
2020s American high school television series
2020s American teen drama television series
2018 American television series debuts
Coming-of-age television shows
English-language Netflix original programming
Fictional rivalries
Japan in non-Japanese culture
Live action television shows based on films
Martial arts television series
Midlife crisis in television
Television series about bullying
Television series by Sony Pictures Television
Television series set in 1965
Television series set in 1968
Television series set in 1979
Television series set in 1984
Television series set in 2018
Television shows filmed in Atlanta
Television shows filmed in Los Angeles
Television shows set in Los Angeles
Television shows adapted into video games
YouTube Premium original series